Let Freedom Ring is an album by jazz saxophonist Jackie McLean, recorded in 1962 and released on the Blue Note label. It features McLean in a quartet with pianist Walter Davis Jr., bassist Herbie Lewis and drummer Billy Higgins.

McLean wrote three of the four compositions. "Melody for Melonae" is dedicated to his daughter (as was an earlier composition, "Little Melonae"), and appeared as "Melanie" on Matador, a later recording that he made with Kenny Dorham. The slower-tempo performance on Let Freedom Ring was the first occasion that McLean used "provocative upper-register screams". "Rene" and "Omega" are both blues-related pieces, the former with a standard twelve-bar structure and harmonies, the latter more abstract and modal. The one non-McLean track is Bud Powell's ballad, "I'll Keep Loving You".

Reception
The Allmusic review by Steve Huey awarded the album 5 stars and stated: "The success of Let Freedom Ring paved the way for a bumper crop of other modernist innovators to join the Blue Note roster and, artistically, it still stands with One Step Beyond as McLean's greatest work." The Penguin Guide to Jazz gives Let Freedom Ring four out of four stars, and includes the album in a select "Core Collection".

Track listing
All compositions by Jackie McLean except where noted
"Melody for Melonae" - 13:24
"I'll Keep Loving You" (Bud Powell) - 6:18
"Rene" - 10:03
"Omega" - 8:31

Personnel
Jackie McLean — alto saxophone
Walter Davis, Jr. — piano
Herbie Lewis — bass
Billy Higgins — drums

References

1963 albums
Jackie McLean albums
Albums produced by Alfred Lion
Blue Note Records albums
Albums recorded at Van Gelder Studio